Djemourah District is a district of Biskra Province, Algeria.

Municipalities
The district has 2 municipalities:
Djemorah
Branis

References

Districts of Biskra Province